is a 1998 Japanese film directed by Akio Jissoji based on a novel by Edogawa Rampo.

Cast
 Hiroyuki Sanada as Seiichiro Fukiya 
 Kyūsaku Shimada as Kogoro Akechi
 Yumi Yoshiyuki

Reception

Awards
20th Yokohama Film Festival
 Won: Best Supporting Actress - Yumi Yoshiyuki

References

Films based on Japanese novels
Films based on works by Edogawa Ranpo
Films directed by Akio Jissoji
1990s Japanese films